The British Academy Television Award for Best Reality and Constructed Factual is one of the major categories of the British Academy Television Awards (BAFTAs), the primary awards ceremony of the British television industry. According to the BAFTA website, the category is for "programmes where participants are put into an environment or format and then observed interacting in situations devised by the producer."

Winners and nominees

2010s

2020s

Note: The series that don't have recipients on the tables had Production team credited as recipients for the award or nomination.

References

External links
List of winners at the British Academy of Film and Television Arts

Reality and Constructed Factual